Mio Tsumura (born 14 April 1995), popularly known as MIO, is a Japanese kickboxer, currently competing in the atomweight division of K-1. 

A professional competitor since 2011, she is a multiple-time Shootboxing tournament winner, having won the Joshikousei tournament in 2012 and 2013, the Girls S-Cup Japan tournament in 2015 and the Asia Tournament in 2016. Tsumura is also the former Shootboxing Japan Minimumweight Champion.

Kickboxing career

Shootboxing

Shoot Boxing Joshikousei tournaments
Tsumura was scheduled to make her professional debut against Yoko Yamada on September 10, 2011. She won her debut by a first-round disqualification. She won her next two fights against Mariko Akechi and Asuka Inoue by unanimous decision, and her fourth professional fight against Tsubaki Oshima by majority decision.

Tsumura took part in the 2012 Joshikousei Shoot Boxing Girls S-Cup, which was open solely to highschool age competitors. She beat Yuuki Kira in the quarterfinals and Tachiyuki in the semifinals by unanimous decision, before facing Eneos Akari in the finals. She beat Akari by a second-round technical knockout.

After losing a majority decision to Momi at Shoot Boxing 2013 act.1, Tsumura was scheduled to participate in the 2013 edition of the Shoot Boxing Joshikousei tournament. She beat Fuuka Yoshino and COMACHI by unanimous decision, to earn her place in the finals against Kira☆Yuuki. Tsumura beat Yuki by a first-round knockout.

Shootboxing Japan tournaments
Tsumura was scheduled to fight Kira☆Chihiro at Shoot Boxing 2013. She won the fight by a majority decision. Tsumura was scheduled to fight Eneos Akari at Shoot Boxing 2014 act.1. She beat Akari by unanimous decision.

Tsumura was scheduled to fight a rematch with Momi in the semifinals of the 2014 Shoot Boxing Girls S-Cup Japan tournament. She won the rematch with Momi by unanimous decision, but lost the final bout against Yukari Yamaguchi by an extra round split decision.

Tsumura fought Hana DATE at Shoot Boxing 2014 act.4, and won the bout by unanimous decision. Tsumura was scheduled to fight Kai Ting Chuang at Onna Matsuri 2015: ~J-Girls x Shoot Boxing~. She won the fight by unanimous decision.

It was announced that Tsumura would take part in the 2015 Shootboxing Japan S-Girls Cup, being scheduled to fight Emi Matsushita in the quarterfinals. She beat Matsushita in the quarterfinals by unanimous decision and Mei Yamaguchi in the semifinals by an extra round decision, before fighting a trilogy match with Momi in the finals. Tsumura won her third match against Momi by an extra round decision.

Shootboxing Asia tournament
Tsumura fought MARI at Shoot Boxing The Last Bomb, and won the fight by unanimous decision. This was followed by a unanimous decision win against MISAKI at Shoot Boxing Young Caesar Cup act.2.

Tsumura participated in the 2016 Shoot Boxing Girls S-Cup Asia Tournament, and faced Yurika GSB in the semifinals. She beat Yurika by unanimous decision in the semifinals and Union Akari by an extra round majority decision in the finals.

Tsumura was scheduled to fight Renju DATE at Shoot Boxing 2016 act.4. She won the fight by a first-round technical knockout. She extended her winning streak to twelve fights in a row with a unanimous decision victory against Mei Umeo at Shoot Boxing Young Caesar Cup act.4.

Shootboxing Japan Minimumweight champion
Tsumura was scheduled to fight a rematch with Union Akari for the Shoot Boxing Japan Minimumweight title, at SHOOT BOXING World Tournament S-Cup 2016. She won the fight by an extra round decision.

After winning the Shootboxing title, Tsumura fought five non-title bouts, winning all five of them. She first beat Hoi Ling Kwok by unanimous decision at SHOOT BOXING 2017 act.1, Vicky Tan by a second-round technical knockout at SHOOT BOXING 2017 act.2, and Hanna Tyson, Rungnapa Por.Muangphet and Phetjee Jaa Or.Meekun by unanimous decision.

Tsumura was scheduled to fight Wu Hoi Yan at Shoot Boxing 2018 act.1, for the Energy Fight×Shoot Boxing −48kg title. She beat Yan by decision.

Tsumura made her first title defense against MISAKI at Shoot Boxing 2018 act.1. She won the fight by majority decision.

Shootboxing Girls S-Cup tournament
Following her first title defense, Tsumura was scheduled to fight So Hee Lim at Shoot Boxing 2018 act.2. Lim came into the fight over the weight limit, and forfeited half of her purse. Lim won the fight by unanimous decision.

Tsumura took part in her first Shootboxing Girls World S-cup on July 6, 2018. She fought a rematch with So Hee Lim in the quarterfinals and won by unanimous decision. She beat Kaewta Por Muengpetch by an extra round decision in the semifinals. Tsumura lost to Jleana Valentino by majority decision in the tournament finals.

Tsumura rebounded from this loss by winning her next three fights against Haruka Yamaguchi, Hinata Terayama and TOMOMI by decision.

K-1
In 2020, Tsumura signed with K-1. She was scheduled to make her debut at K-1 World GP 2020 in Osaka, against Miho Takanashi. Miho won the fight by unanimous decision.

Tsumura next fought Mako Yamada at K-1 World GP 2021: K’Festa 4 Day.2. She beat Yamada by unanimous decision.

Tsumura fought the reigning Krush atomweight champion Miyuu Sugawara at K-1 World GP 2021 Japan Bantamweight Tournament. She won the fight by majority decision. They were scheduled to fight a rematch at Krush 128, for Sugawara's Krush title. Sugawara later withdrew from the bout, due to the COVID-19 protocols. Tsumura was rescheduled to fight Kira Matsutani in an exhibition bout at the same event. The fight ended in a per-determined draw.

Tsumura was rescheduled to challenge the reigning Krush atomweight champion Miyuu Sugawara at Krush 131 on November 20, 2021. She lost the fight by unanimous decision.

Tsumura was scheduled to face Raika at Krush 134 on February 20, 2022. Tsumura announced her withdrawal from the bout on February 10, as she had to undergo surgery to remove a benign ovarian tumor. She successfully underwent surgery on March 8.

Tsumura was booked to face Phayahong Ayothayafightgym at K-1: Ring of Venus on June 25, 2022. She lost the fight by unanimous decision.

Titles and accomplishments
Shoot Boxing
 2018 Shoot Boxing Girls S-Cup −48kg World Tournament Runner-up
 2017 Energy Fight×Shoot Boxing −48kg Champion
 2016 Shoot Boxing Japan Minimumweight Champion (Defended once)
 2016 Shoot Boxing Asia Tournament −48kg Champion
 2015 Shoot Boxing Girls S-Cup Japan Tournament Champion
 2014 Shoot Boxing Girls S-Cup Japan Tournament Runner-up
 2013 Shoot Boxing JK −48kg Tournament Champion
 2012 Shoot Boxing JK −48kg Tournament Champion

Fight record

Mixed martial arts exhibition record

|-
|Win
|align=center|2–1
|Mikiko Hiyama
|Decision (unanimous)
|Kakutou Dairi Sensou 3rd Season
|
|align=center|3
|align=center|5:00
|Japan
|
|-
|Loss
|align=center|1–1
|Itsuki Hirata
|Submission (rear-naked choke)
|Kakutou Dairi Sensou 3rd Season
| 
|align=center|1
|align=center|2:36
|Japan
|
|-
|Win
|align=center|1–0
|Takumi Umehara
|TKO (Punches)
|Kakutou Dairi Sensou 3rd Season
|
|align=center|2
| align=center|4:12
|Japan
|

Kickboxing record

|-  style="background:#fbb"
| 2022-06-25|| Loss|| align=left| Phayahong Ayothayafightgym || K-1: Ring of Venus, Atomweight World Grand Prix Semifinals || Tokyo, Japan || Decision (Unanimous) || 3 || 3:00
|-
|-  style="background:#fbb"
| 2021-11-20|| Loss || align=left| Miyuu Sugawara || Krush 131 || Tokyo, Japan || Decision (Unanimous)|| 3 || 3:00 
|-
! style=background:white colspan=9 |
|-  style="background:#cfc;"
| 2021-05-30|| Win|| align=left| Miyuu Sugawara || K-1 World GP 2021 Japan Bantamweight Tournament || Tokyo, Japan || Decision (Majority) || 3 || 3:00
|-  style="background:#cfc;"
| 2021-03-28|| Win ||align=left| Mako Yamada || K-1 World GP 2021: K’Festa 4 Day.2 || Tokyo, Japan ||  Decision (Unanimous) || 3 || 3:00
|-  style="background:#fbb;"
| 2020-09-22|| Loss||align=left| Takanashi Knuckle Miho|| K-1 World GP 2020 in Osaka || Osaka, Japan || Decision (Unanimous) || 3 || 3:00
|-  style="background:#cfc;"
| 2019-04-27|| Win||align=left| TOMOMI || Shoot Boxing 2019 act.2 || Tokyo, Japan || Decision (Unanimous) || 3 || 3:00
|-  style="background:#cfc;"
| 2019-02-11|| Win||align=left| Hinata Terayama|| Shoot Boxing 2019 act.1 || Tokyo, Japan || Decision (Majority) || 3 || 3:00
|-  style="background:#cfc;"
| 2018-09-15|| Win||align=left| Haruka Yamaguchi || Shoot Boxing 2018 act.4 || Tokyo, Japan || Decision (Unanimous) || 3 || 3:00
|-  style="background:#fbb;"
| 2018-07-06|| Loss||align=left| Jleana Valentino || SHOOT BOXING Girls S-cup 〜48kg World Tournament 2018〜 Final || Tokyo, Japan || Decision (Majority) || 3 || 3:00 
|-
! style=background:white colspan=9 |
|-  style="background:#cfc;"
| 2018-07-06|| Win||align=left| Kaewta Por Muengpetch || SHOOT BOXING Girls S-cup 〜48kg World Tournament 2018〜 Semi Final || Tokyo, Japan || Ext.R Decision (Unanimous) || 4 || 3:00
|-  style="background:#cfc;"
| 2018-07-06|| Win||align=left| So Hee Lim || SHOOT BOXING Girls S-cup 〜48kg World Tournament 2018〜 Quarter Final || Tokyo, Japan || Decision (Unanimous) || 3 || 3:00
|-  style="background:#fbb;"
| 2018-04-01|| Loss||align=left| So Hee Lim || Shoot Boxing 2018 act.2 || Tokyo, Japan || Decision (Unanimous) || 3 || 3:00
|-  style="background:#cfc;"
| 2018-02-10|| Win||align=left| MISAKI || Shoot Boxing 2018 act.1 || Tokyo, Japan || Decision (Majority) || 5 || 3:00 
|-
! style=background:white colspan=9 |
|-  style="background:#cfc;"
| 2017-12-17|| Win||align=left| Wu Hoi Yan || Shoot Boxing 2018 act.1 || Hong Kong || Decision || 5 || 3:00 
|-
! style=background:white colspan=9 |
|-  style="background:#cfc;"
| 2017-11-22|| Win||align=left| Phetjee Jaa Or.Meekun || Shoot Boxing GROUND ZERO TOKYO 2017 || Tokyo, Japan || Decision (Unanimous) || 3 || 3:00
|-  style="background:#cfc;"
| 2017-09-16|| Win||align=left| Rungnapa Por.Muangphet || SHOOT BOXING 2017 act.4 || Tokyo, Japan || Decision (Unanimous) || 3 || 3:00
|-  style="background:#cfc;"
| 2017-07-07|| Win||align=left| Hanna Tyson || SHOOT BOXING Girls S-Cup 2017 || Tokyo, Japan || Decision (Unanimous) || 3 || 3:00
|-  style="background:#cfc;"
| 2017-04-08|| Win||align=left| Vicky Tan || SHOOT BOXING 2017 act.2 || Tokyo, Japan || TKO (Doctor Stoppage) || 2 || 2:00
|-  style="background:#cfc;"
| 2017-02-11|| Win||align=left| Hoi Ling Kwok || SHOOT BOXING 2017 act.1 || Tokyo, Japan || Decision (Majority) || 3 || 3:00
|-  style="background:#cfc;"
| 2016-11-11|| Win||align=left| Union Akari || SHOOT BOXING World Tournament S-Cup 2016  || Tokyo, Japan || Ext.R Decision (Unanimous) || 6 || 3:00 
|-
! style=background:white colspan=9 |
|-  style="background:#cfc;"
| 2016-10-09|| Win||align=left| Mei Umeo || Shoot Boxing Young Caesar Cup act.4  || Tokyo, Japan || Decision (Unanimous) || 3 || 3:00
|-  style="background:#cfc;"
| 2016-09-19|| Win||align=left| Renju DATE || Shoot Boxing 2016 act.4  || Tokyo, Japan || TKO (3 Knockdowns) || 1 || 0:36
|-  style="background:#cfc;"
| 2016-07-07|| Win||align=left| Union Akari || Shoot Boxing Girls S-Cup Asia Tournament, Final || Tokyo, Japan || Ext.R Decision (Majority) || 4 || 3:00 
|-
! style=background:white colspan=9 |
|-  style="background:#cfc;"
| 2016-07-07|| Win||align=left| Yurika GSB || Shoot Boxing Girls S-Cup Asia Tournament, Semi Final || Tokyo, Japan ||  Decision (Unanimous) || 3 || 3:00
|-  style="background:#cfc;"
| 2016-06-18|| Win||align=left| MISAKI || Shoot Boxing Young Caesar Cup act.2 || Tokyo, Japan ||  Decision (Unanimous) || 3 || 3:00
|-  style="background:#cfc;"
| 2015-10-03|| Win||align=left| MARI || Shoot Boxing The Last Bomb || Osaka, Japan ||  Decision (Unanimous) || 3 || 3:00
|-  style="background:#cfc;"
| 2015-08-21|| Win||align=left| Momi || Shoot Boxing Girls S-Cup 2015 Japan Tournament, Final|| Tokyo, Japan ||  Ext.R Decision (Unanimous) || 4 || 3:00
|-
! style=background:white colspan=9 |
|-  style="background:#cfc;"
| 2015-08-21|| Win||align=left| V.V Mei || Shoot Boxing Girls S-Cup 2015 Japan Tournament, Semi  Final|| Tokyo, Japan ||  Ext.R Decision (Unanimous) || 4 || 3:00
|-  style="background:#cfc;"
| 2015-08-21|| Win||align=left| Emi Matsushita || Shoot Boxing Girls S-Cup 2015 Japan Tournament, Quarter Final|| Tokyo, Japan ||  Decision (Unanimous) || 3 || 3:00
|-  style="background:#cfc;"
| 2015-05-24|| Win ||align=left| Kai Ting Chuang || Onna Matsuri 2015: ~J-Girls x Shoot Boxing~ || Tokyo, Japan || Decision (Unanimous) || 3 || 3:00
|-  style="background:#cfc;"
| 2015-02-21|| Win ||align=left| Miho || Shoot Boxing 2015 ~SB 30th Anniversary~ act.1 || Tokyo, Japan || Decision (Unanimous) || 3 || 3:00
|-  style="background:#cfc;"
| 2014-09-20|| Win ||align=left| Hana DATE || Shoot Boxing 2014 act.4 || Tokyo, Japan || Decision (Unanimous) || 3 || 3:00
|-  style="background:#fbb;"
| 2014-08-02|| Loss||align=left| Yukari Yamaguchi || Shoot Boxing Girls S-Cup 2014 Tournament, Final || Tokyo, Japan || Ext.R Decision (Split) || 4 || 2:00
|-
! style=background:white colspan=9 |
|-  style="background:#cfc;"
| 2014-08-02|| Win||align=left| Momi || Shoot Boxing Girls S-Cup 2014 Tournament, Semi Final || Tokyo, Japan || Decision (Unanimous) || 3 || 2:00
|-  style="background:#cfc;"
| 2014-02-23|| Win||align=left| Eneos Akari|| Shoot Boxing 2014 act.1 || Tokyo, Japan || Decision (Unanimous) || 3 || 3:00
|-  style="background:#cfc;"
| 2013-12-23|| Win||align=left| Kira☆Chihiro || Shoot Boxing 2013  || Osaka, Japan || Decision (Majority) || 3 || 3:00
|-  style="background:#cfc;"
| 2013-08-03|| Win||align=left| Kira☆Yuuki || Shoot Boxing Girls S-Cup 2013, Joshikousei Tournament Final|| Tokyo, Japan || KO (Right Hook) || 1 || 1:08
|-
! style=background:white colspan=9 |
|-  style="background:#cfc;"
| 2013-08-03|| Win||align=left| COMACHI || Shoot Boxing Girls S-Cup 2013, Joshikousei Tournament Semi Final|| Tokyo, Japan || Decision (Unanimous) || 3 || 2:00
|-  style="background:#cfc;"
| 2013-04-20|| Win||align=left| Fuuka Yoshino || Shoot Boxing 2013 act.2, Joshikousei Tournament Quarter Final|| Tokyo, Japan || Decision (Unanimous) || 3 || 2:00
|-  style="background:#fbb;"
| 2013-02-22|| Loss||align=left| Momi || Shoot Boxing 2013 act.1|| Tokyo, Japan || Ext.R Decision (Majority) || 4 || 3:00
|-  style="background:#cfc;"
| 2012-08-25|| Win||align=left| Eneos Akari || Shoot Boxing Girls S-Cup 2012, Joshikousei Tournament Final|| Tokyo, Japan || TKO (Towel thrown) || 2 || 1:09
|-
! style=background:white colspan=9 |
|-  style="background:#cfc;"
| 2012-08-25|| Win||align=left| Tachiyuki || Shoot Boxing Girls S-Cup 2012, Joshikousei Tournament Semi Final|| Tokyo, Japan || Decision (Unanimous) || 3 || 2:00
|-  style="background:#cfc;"
| 2012-04-13|| Win||align=left| Yuuki Kira || Shoot Boxing Road to S-Cup act.2, Joshikousei Tournament Quarter Final|| Tokyo, Japan || Decision (Unanimous) || 3 || 2:00
|-  style="background:#cfc;"
| 2012-02-05|| Win||align=left| Tsubaki Oshima || Shoot Boxing Road to S-Cup act.1|| Tokyo, Japan || Decision (Majority) || 3 || 2:00
|-  style="background:#cfc;"
| 2011-11-06|| Win||align=left| Asuka Inoue || Shoot Boxing Shoot the SHOOTO 2011|| Tokyo, Japan || Ext.R Decision (Unanimous) || 4 || 2:00
|-  style="background:#cfc;"
| 2011-09-10|| Win||align=left| Mariko Akechi || Shoot Boxing 2011 act.4|| Tokyo, Japan || Decision (Unanimous) || 3 || 2:00
|-  style="background:#cfc;"
| 2011-09-10|| Win||align=left| Yoko Yamada || Shoot Boxing Girls S-Cup 2011 Japan Selection Tournament|| Tokyo, Japan || Disqualification  || 1|| 1:52
|-
| colspan=9 | Legend:

See also
 List of female kickboxers

References

Living people
1995 births
Japanese female kickboxers
People from Osaka
People from Osaka Prefecture